In the cuisine of the Southern United States, a meat and three restaurant is one where the customer picks one meat from a daily selection of three to six choices (such as fried chicken, country ham, beef, country-fried steak, meatloaf, or pork chop) and three side dishes from a list that may include up to a dozen other options (usually vegetables, potatoes, corn, green or lima beans, but also other selections such as gelatin, creamed corn, macaroni and cheese, spaghetti, or even a dessert).

A meat-and-three meal is often served with cornbread and sweet tea. Meat and three is popular throughout the United States, but its roots can be traced to Tennessee and its capital of Nashville. The phrase has been described as implying "glorious vittles served with utmost informality." It is also associated with soul food.

Similar concepts include the Hawaiian plate lunch, which features a variety of entrée choices but typically has standardized side items, and the southern Louisiana plate lunch, which features menu options that change daily. It is somewhat similar to a blue-plate special but with a more fixed menu. Boston Market and Cracker Barrel chains of restaurants offer a similar style of food selection.

See also 

 Garbage Plate
 List of restaurant terminology

References

Sources 
 
 
 
 
 

Cuisine of the Southern United States
Restaurants by type
Restaurant terminology
Culture of Nashville, Tennessee
Food combinations